Hari Krishna Prasad Vemuru is the first and only Indian to be awarded with the Pioneer Award from Electronic Frontier Foundation. He garnered media-attention after conducting the first independent security review of voting machines used in India's polls. Prasad was jailed by Indian authorities when he sought to conduct an independent security review of India's e-voting process. His research uncovered flaws in the electronic voting machines which could easily give room for election rigging.

References 

Living people
Indian computer scientists
Year of birth missing (living people)